The 2009 Chicago Marathon was the 32nd running of the annual marathon race in Chicago, United States and was held on October 11. The elite men's race was won by Kenya's Samuel Wanjiru in a time of 2:05:41 hours and the women's race was won by Germany's Irina Mikitenko in 2:26:31. The competition was originally won by Russia's Liliya Shobukhova in a time of 2:25:56, but she was retrospectively disqualified due to doping violations.

Results

Men

Women

References

Results. Association of Road Racing Statisticians. Retrieved 2020-04-06.

Chicago Marathon
Chicago
2000s in Chicago
2009 in Illinois
Chicago Marathon
Chicago Marathon